Get a Grip is a satirical comedy television series shown on ITV in the United Kingdom. It aired on Wednesday nights in April/May 2007 and was hosted by Ben Elton and Alexa Chung.

The programme was made by Phil McIntyre Productions and Big Bear Films.

The show received an averaged audience of around 1.5 million, usually being beaten by rival channels BBC One and Channel 4. ITV dropped Get a Grip from its 10pm slot due to poor ratings. The programme was moved to Monday nights after midnight for the rest of the series.

References

2000s British comedy television series
2000s British satirical television series
2007 British television series debuts
2007 British television series endings
ITV comedy